Confusion of Genders is a 2000 French drama film starring Pascal Greggory. It was directed by Ilan Duran Cohen.

Two actors of this film were nominated at the César Awards 2001: Pascal Greggory for Best Actor – Leading Role and Cyrille Thouvenin for Most Promising Actor.

Cast 
 Pascal Greggory as Alain Bauman 
 Nathalie Richard as Laurence Albertini 
 Julie Gayet as Babette 
 Alain Bashung as Etienne 
 Vincent Martinez as Marc 
 Cyrille Thouvenin as Christophe 
 Marie Saint-Dizier as Marlène

External links 
 
 

2000 films
French LGBT-related films
Bisexuality-related films
2000 LGBT-related films
French drama films
2000 drama films
LGBT-related drama films
Films directed by Ilan Duran Cohen
2000s French films